Lucie Šlégrová, née Králová (born 10 February 1982 in Teplice, Czechoslovakia) is a Czech dancer, model and beauty pageant titleholder who won Miss Czech Republic as a 23-year-old in 2005.

Biography 
Lucie Králová was born in the Czech Republic. With a love of Music, Poetry and the Arts, Králová continues to have success on the catwalks of Europe.

Králová was born in the former Czechoslovakia. From the age of 10, she was active in theater and dance, performing in venues throughout the Czech Republic.

Pageants 
Králová was named Miss Teen Teplice in 1997, Miss Teplice in 2003 and Miss North Czech in 2004. She was selected to the finals of the Miss Czech Republic 2004 competition, but withdrew due to family issues. The next year, she again competed and was named Miss Czech Republic 2005 at the age of 23. During the national pageant, she was also titled Miss Congeniality, Miss Voice and Miss Talent for her scenic dance performance.

Králová represented the Czech Republic in the Miss World 2005 competition held in China, where she was again named Miss Talent for her dance performance.

Personal life 
In 2008, Králová married Zdeněk Kaufmann at Chateau Štiřín. The couple have two children, Robert and Richard. Králová presently dedicates herself to raising a family, maintaining a healthy lifestyle and contributing to charitable activities. Following the Miss Czech pageant, she established an endowment fund for the benefit of the elderly. In 2012, Králová and Kaufmann were divorced. In May 2015 she married a former ice hockey player, Jiří Šlégr.

References

External links
 Osobnosti  photo gallery
 Lucie Králová bikini photoshoot BTS video

1982 births
Living people
Czech beauty pageant winners
Miss World 2005 delegates
People from Teplice
Czech female models